Natalya Sharova (born October 4, 1972) was a professional sprinter from Russia. She won a gold medal in the 4x400 m relay at the 1999 World Championships in Athletics and in the 1997 World Indoor Championships in Athletics, in both cases by virtue of running in the heats for her team.

She also won a gold medal in the 4x400m at the 1997 World University Games by running in the final. She continued to run professionally until 2004.

Major international competitions

Domestic competitions

References 

Living people
1972 births
Russian female sprinters
Universiade gold medalists for Russia
Universiade medalists in athletics (track and field)
World Athletics Indoor Championships winners
World Athletics Championships winners
Medalists at the 1997 Summer Universiade